No Time to Die: Original Motion Picture Soundtrack is the soundtrack album to the 25th James Bond film of the same name. Released by Decca Records on 1 October 2021 (a week before the film's North American release), the music was composed by Hans Zimmer, making him the sixth non-British composer after Marvin Hamlisch, Bill Conti, Michael Kamen, Éric Serra and Thomas Newman to score a film in the series. The film's theme song of the same name performed by Billie Eilish, was composed with her brother Finneas O'Connell. The 12" vinyl album version features an additional four short music cues listed only as Q1, Q2, Q3 and Q4.

Development
In July 2019, Dan Romer was announced as composer for the film's score, having previously worked with Cary Joji Fukunaga on Beasts of No Nation and Maniac. Romer left the film due to creative differences in November 2019. Hans Zimmer replaced Romer by January 2020. It is the first time in the Bond series history that a composer has been replaced during post-production, and the second major personnel change for the film after Danny Boyle left as director. Steve Mazzaro produced the score, while Johnny Marr played guitar. London Voices provided the choral element to the soundtrack. The No Time to Die score album was set to be released through Decca Records in March 2020 but was delayed to 1 October 2021 to coincide with the release of the film.

In January 2020, Billie Eilish was announced as the performer of the film's theme song, with her brother, Finneas O'Connell, serving as co-writer as well as the track's producer. The song, which has the same title, was released on 13 February 2020. At the age of 18, Eilish is the youngest artist to record a James Bond theme song. Despite the film's delay, the song was nominated for and won the Grammy Award for Best Song Written for Visual Media at the 63rd Annual Grammy Awards, on 14 March 2021, six months before the film's release date, because the song itself was released during the 2019–20 eligibility period, in anticipation of the film's original April 2020 release date. At the 65th Annual Grammy Awards, Zimmer's score was nominated for Best Score Soundtrack for Visual Media.

The soundtrack contains references to two tracks from On Her Majesty's Secret Service soundtrack:
 We Have All the Time in the World (featured in "Matera"); it appears twice in the film instrumentally, the latter rendition of the theme not being included on album. The full version of the song also plays during the ending credits, but also does not appear on the soundtrack.
 Over and Out (featured in "Good to Have You Back").

Reception
Will Hodgkinson of The Times stated, "The key to a great James Bond theme tune is to capture a sense of nagging emotional loss in a way that’s glamorous. Step forward, Billie Eilish, the world’s most melancholic teenage pop star, who wraps her intimate, whispered vocals over words that, in proper Bond style, seem on the surface to be profound but in fact don’t mean much at all." Saeed Saeed of The National wrote, "While the pulsating score by German composer Hans Zimmer fulfils the brief in heightening the film’s spectacular action sequences, the creation of the music featured a few dramas of its own... The solitary vocal tune in the soundtrack is the titular track performed by Billie Eilish. While the dramatic power ballad, with her trademark whispery vocals and sweeping strings, was acclaimed and won a Grammy Award in March, the recording process wasn’t so smooth."

Track listing 
All tracks are performed by Hans Zimmer, except for "No Time to Die". Writing credits are from the ASCAP repertory.

Charts

See also
 James Bond music
 Outline of James Bond

References 

2020s film soundtrack albums
2021 soundtrack albums
Hans Zimmer soundtracks
Soundtrack albums from James Bond films
Albums postponed due to the COVID-19 pandemic